Joseph Graves may refer to:
Joseph L. Graves Jr. (born 1955), American biologist and educator
Joseph Graves (politician), member of the Michigan House of Representatives
Joe Graves (1906–1980), baseball player